= Shunlin Liang =

Shunlin Liang is an aerospace engineer at the University of Hong Kong. There he is the Chair Professor and Head of the Department of Geography. He was named a Fellow of the Institute of Electrical and Electronics Engineers (IEEE) in 2013 for his contributions to remote sensing from satellite observations. Additionally, he was elected by his academic peers as a 2023 Fellow of the American Association for the Advancement of Science (AAAS) in recognition of his outstanding contributions to the field.

Liang received the Ph.D. degree in remote sensing and GIS from Boston University.
